Evan Llewellyn may refer to:

 Evan Llewelyn (1875–1967), Australian politician
 Evan Henry Llewellyn (1847–1914), British Army officer and politician